is a former Japanese football player.

Club career
Yoshikawa was born in Chiba Prefecture on November 8, 1978. After graduating from University of Tsukuba, he joined Consadole Sapporo with team mate Yushi Soda in 2001. He debuted in 2002 season. Although he mainly played as defender, he also played as defensive midfielder. However he could hardly play in the match and retired end of 2003 season.

National team career
In August 1995, Yoshikawa was selected Japan U-17 national team for 1995 U-17 World Championship. He played full time in all 3 matches.

Club statistics

References

External links

1978 births
Living people
University of Tsukuba alumni
Association football people from Chiba Prefecture
Japanese footballers
Japan youth international footballers
J1 League players
J2 League players
Hokkaido Consadole Sapporo players
Association football defenders